Fish Heads and Tails is a 1989 compilation album from the Scottish group Goodbye Mr Mackenzie collecting together a selection of live tracks, out-takes and cover versions.

Track listing

LP & cassette

"Amsterdam" (Jacques Brel, Mort Shuman)
"Somewhere in China" (The Shop Assistants)
"Calton Hill" (Kelly, Metcalfe)
"Secrets" (Kelly, Metcalfe)
"Face to Face"  (Metcalfe)
"Sick of You" (James Osterberg, James Williamson)
"Green Turn Red" (Kelly, Metcalfe)
"Pleasure Search" (Kelly, Metcalfe)
"Mystery Train" (Junior Parker, Sam Phillips)
"Knockin' on Joe" (Nick Cave)1

CD

"Amsterdam" (Jacques Brel, Mort Shuman)
"Somewhere in China" (The Shop Assistants)
"Face to Face"  (Metcalfe)
"Knockin' on Joe" (Nick Cave)1
"Sick of You" (James Osterberg, James Williamson)
"Green Turn Red" (Kelly, Metcalfe)
"Pleasure Search" (Kelly, Metcalfe)
"Strangle Your Animal" (Metcalfe)
"Mystery Train" (Junior Parker, Sam Phillips)
"Here Comes Deacon Brodie" (Kelly, Metcalfe)1

Personnel
Martin Metcalfe - lead vocals
John Duncan - guitar 
Fin Wilson - bass guitar 
Shirley Manson - keyboards and backing vocals 
Rona Scobie - keyboards and backing vocals 
Derek Kelly - drums

References

Goodbye Mr Mackenzie albums
B-side compilation albums
1989 compilation albums
Capitol Records compilation albums